Easwari Rao is an Indian actress who has worked in Telugu, Tamil, Malayalam, and Kannada cinema. She played the lead roles from 1990 to 1999. She started to play supporting and character roles from 2000 onwards.

Personal life 
She married director L. Raja in 2005. The couple have 2 children: 1 son and 1 daughter.

Career
Eswari Rao's debut movie was Intinta Deepavali (1990) in Telugu; she came to prominence in Telugu with the film Rambantu alongside Rajendra Prasad. She debuted in Tamil in Kavithai Paadum Alaigal (1990) credited as Janani. Though the songs were popular, the movie was a failure in box office. She got her first major break in Raman Abdullah (1997), directed by Balu Mahendra, where she was credited as Easwari Rao. She notably opted out of a project titled Koottaali as she felt the role was too glamorous. She went on to appear in Manoj Kumar's film Guru Paarvai (1998). Eeshwari also had a role in Bharathiraja's Siragugal Murivadhilai, although the film was shelved after pre-production. In the Tamil film Appu (2000) she portrayed Prasanth's sister. She received praise for her performance as Selvi in Kaala (2018).

Filmography

Films

Television
 Kokila Enge Pogiraal (Sun TV)
 Peyarai Solla vaa (Sun TV/Vikatan Televistas)
 Udhayam (Sun TV) Radaan Mediaworks
 Kasthuri (Sun TV)
 Aval Appadithan (Jaya TV)
 Ninne Pelladutha (Gemini TV)
 Vennalamma (Gemini TV)
 Agni Saatchi (Vijay TV)
 Vazhnthu Kaatukiren (AVM Productions) (Sun TV)
 Maya  (Jaya TV)
 Aaha (Vijay TV)
 Kantham Kathalu (Dooradarshan - Telugu)

Awards and nominations

References

External links 
 

20th-century Indian actresses
21st-century Indian actresses
Actresses in Kannada television
Actresses in Malayalam cinema
Actresses in Tamil cinema
Actresses in Tamil television
Actresses in Telugu cinema
Actresses in Telugu television
Indian film actresses
Indian television actresses
Living people
Place of birth missing (living people)
Tamil Nadu State Film Awards winners
Year of birth missing (living people)